Brendan Walsh (born 1973) is an Irish Gaelic football manager and former player who played for Cork Senior Championship club Clonakilty. He played for the Cork senior football team for three years, during which time he usually lined out as a right wing-forward.

Honours

Clonakilty
Cork Senior Football Championship (2): 1996, 2009

Cork
Munster Senior Football Championship (1): 1999
National Football League (1): 1998-99

References

1973 births
Living people
Clonakilty Gaelic footballers
Cork inter-county Gaelic footballers
Gaelic football managers